Television in Palestine has programming that has in its history sometimes leaned towards social events or economics but a major theme has been politics. The Palestinian Authority creates cultural values in part through public programs created for its citizens. The programs vary from children's shows to dramas.

This article gives an overview of the genres, broadcasting companies and media related to television broadcast by and with approval of the Palestinian Authority government and viewed by citizens of the Palestinian Authority in areas occupied by Israel.

The PA received authority over its areas of governance following ratification of the Oslo Accords Agreement which failed when the ceasefire were broken.

 Examples of television programs and channels include Al-Aqsa TV, Al-Quds TV, Palestine Radio and TV Corporation, Palestinian Broadcasting Corporation, Palestinian Satellite Channel and formerly, Sanabel TV.

References